X Factor was a Dutch television music talent show contested by aspiring pop singers drawn from public auditions. It was shown Friday evenings on the RTL4 Network in the Netherlands. The show aired between 2006 and 2013 and was produced by Blue Circle. The "X Factor" of the title refers to the undefinable "something" that makes for star quality.

X Factor replaced the highly successful Idols, which was pulled from television after the third and fourth seasons.

In the initial televised audition phase of the show, contestants sang in front of the X Factor judges in the hope of getting through to the "boot camp". After a further selection process, the judges were each given a category to mentor and the chosen finalists then progress to the second phase of the competition in which the public vote on live performances. Judges have included pop singer and television host Gordon Heuckeroth, former Dolly Dots member Angela Groothuizen, Rapper Ali Bouali, and Alto saxophonist Candy Dulfer.

The first season of X Factor began in October 2006 and ran to February 2007. It was not as popular as Idols, and was won by Sharon Kips. The second season, running from January to May 2009, was more successful. It was won by Lisa Hordijk. The third season was won by Jaap van Reesema, Rochelle Perts won the fourth season, and the fifth season was won by Haris Alagic.

Format
The show was primarily concerned with identifying singing talent, through appearance, personality, stage presence and dance routines are also an important element of many performances. The single most important attribute that the judges were seeking, however, was the ability to appeal to a mass market of pop fans.

For the first season, the competition was split into three categories: Solo Singers aged 15–25, Solo Singers aged 26 and over, and Vocal Groups (including duos). After the first season, the 15 to 25 category was split into separate male and female sections, making four categories in all: 15–25 males ("Boys"), 15–25 females ("Girls"), Over 26s, and Groups.

There were five stages to the X Factor competition:
Stage 1: Producers' auditions (these auditions decide who will sing in front of the judges)
Stage 2: Judges' auditions
Stage 3: X Campus
Stage 4: Visits to judges' houses
Stage 5: Live shows (finals)

Season summary
To date, five seasons have been broadcast, as summarised below.

 Contestant in "Henkjan Smits"
 Contestant in "Marianne van Wijnkoop"
 Contestant in "Henk Temming"
 Contestant in "Eric van Tijn"
 Contestant in "Gordon Heuckeroth"
 Contestant in "Angela Groothuizen"
 Contestant in "Stacey Rookhuizen"
 Contestant in "Ali B"
 Contestant in "Candy Dulfer"

Judges' categories and their contestants
In each season, each judge was allocated a category to mentor and chose a small number of acts to progress to the live finals. This table shows, for each series, which category each judge was allocated and which acts he or she put through to the live finals.

Key:
 – Winning judge/category. Winners are in bold.

Seasons

X Factor 1 (2007)

Colour key:

X Factor 2 (2009)

Colour key:

X Factor 3 (2010)

Colour key:

Notes
*1 Gordon didn't attend the 7th live show so Edsillia Rombley replaced him. Therefore, Edsillia was the one who cast the vote for him.

X Factor 4 (2011)

Colour key:

 Rookhuizen was not required to vote because Heuckenroth and Groothuizen had already voted to eliminate Tania Christopher.
 Heuckenroth was not present at this show because of De Toppers In Concert, in this show Heuckenroth was replaced by Ruud de Wild. De Wild voted to eliminate Pyke Pos.

X Factor 5 (2013)

Colour key:

Dutch X Factor Trivia, disputes and controversies
In May 2010, X Factor judge, and popular Dutch singer Gordon decided to vote off popular candidate Sumera Espinel Martinez when she landed in the Bottom Two, explaining that he did not like her facial expressions. She was a Dutch audience favourite. In the official X Factor rules, the role of the jury is to ensure that any exceptional singing talents make it through, judging solely on the voice quality of the contestants. Gordon had voted off Sumera Espinel Martinez because he felt her facial expressions (he perceived them as being too arrogant) were not fitting for a potential winner, as his own personal judgment. This was in contradiction to the X Factor rules, because the jury may not vote anyone off because of their appearance.

Sumera countered Gordon's criticism, by explaining that she had been criticized for being too humble and a bit insecure, and so, that "[she had been asked] to be secure and confident, which is what [she] did."

Sumera Espinel Martinez had received a great majority of the votes, in comparison to her fellow Bottom Two contestant Kelvin. Gordon's voting off of Sumera heaved great controversy among viewers; various petitions were created boycotting the show, and criticizing its format. In an interview with Dutch newspaper De Telegraaf, Gordon was quoted as saying she was too Nederland 3 (meaning that she was too arrogant). An initial article about the controversy was published on the Dutch MSN, at first in a fairly neutral light, but later edited in Gordon's favor. 

In the following episode, Gordon could not participate for one show because he was giving a concert with his group, De Toppers in the Amsterdam Arena. Edsilia Rombley was asked as guest judge/coach for him, in this episode. His last remaining act, BadBoyz was voted off on this episode. As a consequence, Gordon threatened to leave X Factor. He later explained however, that, "it was not the elimination of BadBoyz, but the jury's criticisms that caused me to reconsider my job. I will attend the show on Friday unless something else comes up."

According to De Telegraaf, Gordon has sent his driver to the X Factor studio, to withdraw his colleagues' invitations for De Toppers in Concert.
"They are not welcome at my De Toppers concert at the Arena. I haven't licked my wounds yet, and they've simply taken revenge on my BadBoyz act. I find it shameful!"
He was particularly angered at the remarks of Stacey Rookhuizen. "It does not make any sense to me, that Boy and J-Me [the two members of the BadBoyz] looked homosexual; this has nothing to do with their ability as artists. They were merely mocking my sexual orientation!" 

At the start of the show following the controversy, hosts Wendy and Martijn clearly remarked that Gordon's absence had nothing to do with Sumera's elimination. Following the BadBoyz' elimination, Wendy van Dijk further remarked that "the boys were better off getting a hug from [guest judge/coach] Edsilia Rombley, than from Gordon."

Gordon reportedly sent an email to the administration of RTL, with his criticisms of the way the BadBoyz' elimination was handled. The email supposedly included criticisms of all jury members, as well as hosts Wendy van Dijk and Martijn Krabbé. The exact content of the email was not released to the public. 

Henkjan Smits, famous for himself being a previous X-Factor and Idols judge, remarked that he found this year's candidates "below average." He was concerned that all those with potential had been sent home by the jury prematurely, due to the coach/judging system. Smits had always been critical of the X-Factor "formula."

Henkjan Smits: "The Jury is insulted if I say that this year's talent isn't that great, but I'm simply a viewer now. The start of this season was so promising, but it ended very disappointing," he was quoted as saying to Veronica Magazine."

References

'She is too much channel 3'

External links
X Factor at rtl.nl (Official website – in Dutch)

Netherlands
Dutch music
Dutch reality television series
Television series by Fremantle (company)
2006 Dutch television series debuts
Dutch television series based on British television series
RTL 4 original programming